Colmán mac Comán (died 751) was Abbot of Aran, Ireland.

He was one of the few known successors of Enda of Aran, and appears to be the second such abbot listed in the Irish annals after Enda himself.

Annalistic reference

From the Annals of the Four Masters:

 751. Repose of Colmán mac Comán, in Ára.

See also

 Inishmore

External links
 http://www.ucc.ie/celt/online/T100005A.html
Catholic Encyclopedia 1908: "The Monastic School of Aran"
Rev. Clifford Stevens, The One Year Book of Saints "St. Enda"

8th-century deaths
8th-century Christian saints
Christian clergy from County Galway
Medieval Irish saints
8th-century Irish abbots
Year of birth unknown